Singapore Sue is a 1932 musical comedy short written and directed by Casey Robinson. It was one of Cary Grant's first film roles. After working in the theater, while in New York, a West Coast scout discovered him in a Broadway play called "The Last Flight" and offered him a small role, as a young soldier, in Singapore Sue, he was hired on May 8, 1931, for six days and paid $150 for his work.

Plot
The story is about four sailors and one of them enjoys himself at the bar.

Cast
Anna Chang as Singapore Sue
Joe Wong as Gigolo and Singer
Cary Grant as First Sailor (uncredited)
 Pickard's Chinese Syncopators

Production
The film was shot at Kaufman Astoria Studios.

Soundtrack
How Can a Girl Say No? 
Sung by Anna Chang 
Open Up Those Eyes 
Music by Johnny Green
Lyrics by Edward Heyman
Sung by Joe Wong and  Pickard's Chinese Syncopaters

References

External links
Singapore Sue in the Internet Movie Database
Film on YouTube

1932 films
1932 short films
1932 musical comedy films
American black-and-white films
Paramount Pictures short films
American musical comedy films
Films set in Singapore
Films shot at Astoria Studios
Films directed by Casey Robinson
1930s American films